Plouider is a commune in the Finistère department of Brittany in north-western France.

Population
Inhabitants of Plouider are called in French Plouidérois.

See also
Communes of the Finistère department

References

Mayors of Finistère Association

External links

Official website 

Communes of Finistère